The Peace Bridge is an international bridge between Canada and the United States at the east end of Lake Erie at the source of the Niagara River, about  upriver of Niagara Falls. It connects Buffalo, New York, in the United States to Fort Erie, Ontario, in Canada. It is operated and maintained by the binational Buffalo and Fort Erie Public Bridge Authority.

The Peace Bridge consists of five arched spans over the Niagara River and a Parker deck type truss span over the Black Rock Canal on the American side of the river. Material used in the construction included  of steelwork, 9,000 tons of structural steel and 800 tons of reinforcing steel in the concrete abutments. The Peace Bridge was named to commemorate 100 years of peace between the United States and Canada. It was constructed as a highway bridge to address pedestrian and motor vehicle traffic which could not be accommodated on the International Railway Bridge, built in 1873.

History

The building of the Peace Bridge was approved by the International Joint Commission on August 6, 1925. Edward Lupfer served as chief engineer.  A major obstacle to building the bridge was the swift river current, which averages . Construction began in 1925 and was completed in the spring of 1927. On March 13, 1927, Lupfer drove the first car across the bridge. On June 1, 1927, the bridge was opened to the public.

The official opening ceremony was held two months later, on August 7, 1927, with about 100,000 in attendance.  The festivities were transmitted to the public via radio in the first international coast-to-coast broadcast.  Newspapers at the time estimated that as many as 50 million listeners may have heard the broadcast.

The dignitaries who took part in the dedication ceremonies included The Prince of Wales (the future Edward VIII), Prince George, Canadian Prime Minister William Lyon Mackenzie King, British Prime Minister Stanley Baldwin, U.S. Vice President Charles Dawes, Secretary of State Frank Kellogg, New York Governor Al Smith and Ontario Premier Howard Ferguson.

When the bridge opened, Buffalo and Fort Erie each became the chief port of entry to their respective countries from the other. At the time it was the only vehicular bridge on the Great Lakes from Niagara Falls to New York. The bridge remains one of North America's important commercial ports with four thousand trucks crossing it daily.

After new toll facilities were installed on the Canadian side in 2005, the Peace Bridge became the first E-ZPass facility outside the United States. There are no fees for entering the US.

Alternatives
The Peace Bridge is one of the busiest on the Canada–United States border, with over one million trucks crossing it each year and delays of up to almost four hours. Other nearby bridges between the United States and Canada include the Rainbow Bridge, the Queenston-Lewiston Bridge and the Whirlpool Rapids Bridge. The Queenston-Lewiston Bridge and the Peace Bridge are the only Niagara River crossings that allow heavy trucks.

Customs inspection and toll plazas

There are customs plazas at both ends of the bridge, with the Canadian plaza the newer and larger of the two.

The inbound customs plaza in the United States has seven lanes for trucks and nine for cars. Pedestrians and cyclists are processed to the left of the truck inspection area.

The inbound customs plaza in Canada was designed by NORR Limited Architects and Engineers and completed in 2010. There are 14 booths/lanes for cars and a separate area for trucks (handling five trucks at a time). Pedestrians and cyclists are processed in an area on the right side of the inspection area for cars.

Once vehicles leave the customs plaza in Canada, vehicles approach a smaller toll plaza to pay toll for using the Peace Bridge. Payment for tolls are accepted in cash ($8.00 USD or $10.25 CAD), E-ZPass ($4.00 USD), or old Peace Bridge tokens. There are no toll booths when entering the U.S. and no tolls for pedestrians or cyclists.

Preclearance

In October 2012, it was announced by the DHS and Public Safety Canada that a pilot program, years in the works, to preclear all truck traffic from Canada into Buffalo would be commenced. The pilot would start in late December 2012 and run for 18 months, after which the economic benefits would be assessed and its feasibility to make permanent would then be recommended to both U.S Congress and the Parliament of Canada.

Road connections
On the New York side, Interstate 190 has a direct northbound off-ramp (exit 9) onto the Peace Bridge. On the Ontario side, the Queen Elizabeth Way begins at the Canadian Customs plaza.

Commemorations

 Buffalo resident Emma M. Herold-Haft composed the Peace Bridge March in honor of the bridge's opening in 1927.
 On August 4, 1977, Canada Post and the United States Postal Service brought out a joint issue of postage stamps to commemorate the 50th anniversary of the bridge. Unusual for joint issues, the two designs are radically different, with the US print being all blue and the Canadian print in full colour).

See also
 List of bridges in Canada
 List of crossings of the Niagara River
 List of reference routes in New York
 Peace Bridge robins

References

Further reading

External links

Peace Bridge Authority
 
Images from the Historic Niagara Digital Collections

1927 establishments in Canada
1927 establishments in New York (state)
Canada–United States border crossings
Bridges completed in 1927
Bridges in Buffalo, New York
Bridges over the Niagara River
Buildings and structures in Buffalo, New York
Canada–United States bridges
Open-spandrel deck arch bridges in Canada
Open-spandrel deck arch bridges in the United States
Parker truss bridges in the United States
Pratt truss bridges
Road bridges in New York (state)
Road bridges in Ontario
Roads with a reversible lane
Steel bridges in Canada
Steel bridges in the United States
Toll bridges in Canada
Toll bridges in New York (state)
Transport in Fort Erie, Ontario
Transportation buildings and structures in Erie County, New York
Truss arch bridges in Canada
Truss arch bridges in the United States
Peace symbols